John Kay (12 January 1910 – 16 February 1999) was a British cricket correspondent for the Manchester Evening News from the end of the Second World War to 1975 and for the Brighton Argus. He toured Australia for the 1950-51 Ashes series for the Manchester Evening News and wrote several cricketing books, including Ashes to Hassett (1951) and Cricket in the Leagues (1970). He played for Middleton in the Central Lancashire League and when Basil d'Oliveira emigrated from South Africa in 1960 because Apartheid banned him from playing first-class cricket he arranged for him to play for Middleton as a professional. He wrote that d'Oliveira was surprised to see white people serving him in restaurants and doing menial work. D'Oliveira later played for Worcestershire County Cricket Club (from 1964) and England (from 1966).

Kay's prose style was colourful and he could be critical, as evidenced by these two examples from Ashes to Hassett:

All Australia honoured Hutton as the world's best batsman, and never did a man play harder or more successfully on his country's behalf…One man cannot make a cricket team, but Len Hutton did the next best thing in Australia last winter. He stood alone. Superb in craftsmanship, magnificent in the hour of stress, veritably a giant among all batsmen and worthy of ranking with such famous names as Hobbs, Sutcliffe, Woolley, Hammond ... they were masters of all they surveyed. So was Hutton.

The First Test between Australia and England is played nowadays at Brisbane. Nobody seems to know why, and all sorts of arguments are ventilated for and against more cricket Tests on the Woolloongabba ground. I am all in favour of robbing Queensland of its greatest cricketing occasion, for the ground depresses. It is not a cricket ground at all. It is a concentration camp! Wire fences abound. Spectators are herded and sorted out into lots as though for all the world this was a slave market and not a game of cricket. The stands are of wood and filthy to sit on. The dining rooms are barns, without a touch of colour or a picture on the wall. Everywhere there is dust and dirt ... The field is rough, although the wicket is usually a good one until it rains. Then it is a strip of turf with thousands of demons prancing up and down ... at Brisbane only a Hutton could stay, let alone score runs.

References

1910 births
1999 deaths
British sports journalists